Millhaven is an unincorporated community in Screven County, in the U.S. state of Georgia. In 2007 the population was estimated to be around 434 people.

History
The community was named for a mill which stood on the banks of Brier Creek. The name is sometimes spelled out as "Mill Haven". A post office called Mill Haven was established in 1825, and remained in operation until 1967.

References

Unincorporated communities in Screven County, Georgia
Unincorporated communities in Georgia (U.S. state)